Otto Evert Muikku (7 July 1901 – 17 May 1963) was a Finnish politician, born in Pielisjärvi. He was a Member of the Parliament of Finland from 1945 to 1958, representing the Social Democratic Party of Finland (SDP).

References

1901 births
1963 deaths
People from Lieksa
People from Kuopio Province (Grand Duchy of Finland)
Social Democratic Party of Finland politicians
Members of the Parliament of Finland (1945–48)
Members of the Parliament of Finland (1948–51)
Members of the Parliament of Finland (1951–54)
Members of the Parliament of Finland (1954–58)